Closterium is a genus of unicellular charophyte green algae in the family Closteriaceae.

Taxonomy 
Closterium regulare  was first described from Lower Normandy by Brebisson.

Species 

Closterium includes the following species:

 C. acerosum
 C. calosporum
 C. calosporum var. himalayense
 C. cornu
 C. ehrenbergii
 C. gracile
 C. incurvum
 C. littorale
 C. lunula
 C. moniliferum
 C. navicula
 C. peracerosum
 C. peracerosum-strigosum-littorale complex
 C. pleurodermatum
 C. pusillum
 C. selenastrum
 C. setaceum
 C. spinosporum
 C. tumidum
 C. venus
 C. wallichii

Reproduction 
Asexual: binary fission from a partitioned parent cell.

Sexual: Conjugation to form a hypnozygote.

The Closterium peracerosum-strigosum-littorale (C. psl) complex is a unicellular, isogamous charophycean alga cells that is the closest unicellular relative to land plants.  These algae are capable of forming two types of dormant diploid zygospores.  Some populations form zygospores within single clones of cells (homothallic), whereas others form zygospores between different clones of cells (heterothallic).  The heterothallic strains have two mating types, mt(-) and mt(+).  When cells of opposite mating types are mixed in a nitrogen-deficient mating medium, mt(-) and mt(+) cells pair with each other and release protoplasts. This release is then followed by protoplast fusion (conjugation) leading to formation of a diploid zygospore.  Sex pheromones termed protoplast-release inducing proteins produced by mt(-) and mt(+) cells facilitate this process.

A homothallic strain of Closterium forms selfing zygospores via the conjugation of two sister gametangial cells derived from one vegetative cell.   Conjugation in the homothallic strain occurs mainly at low cell density and is regulated by an ortholog of a heterothallic sex-specific pheromone.

Although self-fertilization employs meiosis, it produces minimal genetic variability. Homothallism is thus a form of sex that is unlikely to be adaptively maintained by a benefit related to producing variability. However, homothallic meiosis may be maintained in Closterium peracerosum as an adaptation for surviving under stressful conditions such as growth in nitrogen depleted media at low cell density.  A proposed adaptive benefit of meiosis is the promotion of homologous recombinational repair of DNA damages that can be caused by a stressful environment

Fun facts 

 The ends of the closterium are called polar vacuoles.
 Inside the vacuoles are crystals called "gypsum crystals"

References

External links

Scientific references

Scientific databases 

 
 AlgaTerra database
 Index Nominum Genericorum

Desmidiales
Charophyta genera